Yenal is a Turkish given name and surname. Notable people with the name include:

 Yenal Tuncer, Turkish footballer
 Meriç Banu Yenal, Turkish basketball player
 Metin Yenal, German actor

Turkish-language surnames
Turkish masculine given names